Joe Paul Brewster (October 26, 1935 – August 8, 2021) was an American football coach. He served as the head football coach at Austin Peay State University from 1988 to 1989, compiling a record of 3–19. A native of Lenoir City, Tennessee, Brewster earned a bachelor's degree in 1958 and a master's degree in 1967 at East Tennessee State University. He came to Austin Peay in 1981 as an assistant coach under his predecessor as head coach, Emory Hale.

Brewster died on August 8, 2021.

Head coaching record

References

1935 births
2021 deaths
Austin Peay Governors football coaches
High school football coaches in Tennessee
East Tennessee State University alumni
People from Lenoir City, Tennessee
Coaches of American football from Tennessee